Gael Margaret Martin  is an Australian Bayesian econometrician, known for her work in simulation-based inference and time series analysis of non-Gaussian data. She is a professor of econometrics and business statistics at Monash University, an associate investigator in the Australian Research Council (ARC) Centre of Excellence for Mathematical and Statistical Frontiers, and a Fellow of the Academy of the Social Sciences in Australia.

Martin has a bachelor's degree from the University of Melbourne, and a second bachelor's, master's, and PhD from Monash University, completed in 1997 under the supervision of Grant Hillier. She was an ARC Future Fellow for 2010–2013, and was a keynote speaker at Bayes on the Beach 2017, a biennial Australian statistics conference.

She was the honours supervisor of Huan Yun Xiang, who killed two Monash students in 2002 in the Monash University shooting.

References

External links
Home page

Year of birth missing (living people)
Living people
Australian economists
Australian women economists
Australian statisticians
Women statisticians
Bayesian econometricians
University of Melbourne alumni
Monash University alumni
Academic staff of Monash University
Fellows of the Academy of the Social Sciences in Australia